This is a partial chronological list of cases decided by the United States Supreme Court during the Stone Court, the tenure of Chief Justice Harlan F. Stone from July 3, 1941 through April 22, 1946.

References

External links 
 The Stone Court, 1941-1945, History of the Court Supreme Court Historical Society.

Stone
List